Lifetime may refer to:

 Life expectancy, the length of time a person is expected to remain alive

Arts, entertainment, and media

Music 
 Lifetime (band), a rock band from New Jersey
 Life Time (Rollins Band album), by Rollins Band
 Life Time (Tony Williams album), by American jazz drummer Tony Williams
 Lifetime (Lifetime album), a 2007 album by the band Lifetime
 Lifetime (Real Life album), 1990
 Lifetime (Klein album), 2019
 LifeTimes, a 1979 album by Diana Hubbard
 "Lifetime" (Katharine McPhee song), a 2010 song from Unbroken
 "Lifetime" (Noah and the Whale song)
 "Lifetime" (Maxwell song), a 2002 song by American R&B singer Maxwell
 "Lifetime" (Usher song)
 "Lifetime", a 2021 song by Justin Bieber from Justice 
 "Lifetimes", a 2001 Progressive house track by Slam
 "A Lifetime", a 2001 song by Better Than Ezra
 "Lifetimes" (song), a 2005 song by Sheryl Crow from Wildflower
 "Lifetime" (Swedish House Mafia song)
 "Lifetime" (Three Days Grace song)
 "Lifetime", a 2009 song by Kris Allen from Kris Allen

Television 
 "Life Time" (M*A*S*H), a 1979 episode of the TV series M*A*S*H
 Lifetime (Southeast Asian TV channel), an Asian television channel owned by A+E Networks Asia
 Lifetime (TV network), a cable television programming network geared towards women
 Lifetime (Canadian TV channel), the Canadian version of the TV channel of the same name
 Lifetime (British and Irish TV channel), a defunct British entertainment television channel
 Lifetime Entertainment Services (LES), an American entertainment industry company
 LMN, formerly Lifetime Movie Network and Lifetime Movies, an American digital cable and satellite television network

Other uses in arts, entertainment, and media
 Lifetimes, an alternative English-language title for a 1994 Chinese film, also known as To Live
 Lifetimes: True Accounts of Reincarnation (1979), a book by Frederick Lenz
 Lifetimes, alternate English title for the 1994 Chinese film To Live

Duration or time span
 Mean lifetime, a certain number that characterizes the rate of reduction ("decay") of an assembly of unstable particles
 Object lifetime, in object-oriented programming, the time between an object's creation until the object is no longer used
 Product lifetime, a product's expected lifetime
 Service life, a product's expected time in use between point of sale and point of discard

Enterprises and organizations
 Lifetimes, a museum in Croydon, England (1995–2004), now known as the Museum of Croydon
 Lifetime Products, a manufacturer of tables, chairs, outdoor sheds, utility trailers, and residential basketball equipment

See also 
Life span (disambiguation)